This is a list of the navigable canals and rivers in France. For reference purposes, all waterways are listed, including many that have been abandoned for navigation, mostly in the period 1925-1955, but some in later years. Although several sources are used and listed in the references below, an important source of up-to-date information on French waterways is Inland Waterways of France, by David Edwards-May (published by Imray Ltd in 2010), and its online version, navigation details for 80 French rivers and canals (French waterways website section). Other sources using the same public information are the historic publishing house Berger-Levrault, Hugh McKnight, David Jefferson, Editions de l'Ecluse (Fluvial magazine) and the series of waterway guides published by Les Editions du Breil, all listed below the table. A comprehensive historic list with 513 entries for French canals is published online by Charles Berg.

List 
The list includes two major rivers, the Rhine and the Rhône, that have their source in Switzerland, while others flow out of France into Germany, Luxemburg and Belgium (the Sarre, Moselle, Sambre, Escaut and Lys). Cross-border canals change their name at the border. The canals are listed in order of the Sort name column. Locations given in red are temporary limits of navigation, where continued restoration works are under way or planned.

The Map column should be used in conjunction with the map to the right which may be enlarged, to see the location of the waterway in relation to the overall network.

Below the table are References, grouped together to avoid fastidious repetition, while notes on status, navigability or connections are added under the third column heading 'Navigability'.

See publications listing canals and waterways in France 
Edwards-May, David (2010). Inland Waterways of France. Imray Ltd. 
Voies Navigables France Itinéraires Fluviaux. Editions De L'Ecluse. 2009. .
Jefferson, David (2009). Through the French Canals. Adlard Coles Nautical. p. 275. .
McKnight, Hugh (2005). Cruising French Waterways, 4th Edition. Sheridan House. .
Rolt, L. T. C. (1994). From Sea to Sea (2nd edition), Euromapping .
"La gestion du Canal de la Bruche" [The management of the Canal Bruche] (in French). Conseil Départemental du Bas-Rhin. Archived from the original on 16 September 2015. Retrieved 16 September 2015.
Loire Nivernais Waterways Guide 02. Editions du Breil, Castelnaudary, France, .
Seine Waterways Guide 21. Editions du Breil, Castelnaudary, France, 2016. .

See also 
 Rivers in France
 Canal de Craponne

Notes
Sort Name  The first key word of the title.

References

 
France
Canals
Canals
Canals